Nanjundi is a 2003 Indian Kannada-language drama film directed and written by S. R. Brothers and produced by Ramu. The film stars Shiva Rajkumar and Debina Bonnerjee along with Umashri and Lokesh in other pivotal roles. The film's highlight was the exclusive shot of the famous Kambala race that happens along the coastal region of Karnataka.

The film featured original score and soundtrack composed and written by Hamsalekha which marked his 250th film work. A R Aravmundan won Karnataka State Film Award for Best Sound Recording award for the year 2003–04.

Cast 
 Shiva Rajkumar as Nanjundi
 Debina Bonnerjee
 Umashri 
 Lokesh
 Suresh Heblikar
 Ramakrishna
 Doddanna
 Karibasavaiah
 Sadhu Kokila
 M.N Lakshmi Devi
 Chitra Shenoy
 Shobha Raghavendra
 M. P. Shankar
 M. S. Karanth
 Biradar
 Karthik Sharma

Soundtrack 
The music was composed by Hamsalekha scoring for his 250th film. Veteran singers like S. Janaki, K. J. Yesudas, S. P. Balasubrahmanyam among others have sung for the songs as a mark to their long association with the composer. The soundtrack is said to be purely associated with traditional musical instruments without any usage of the modern electronic instruments.

References

External links 

 Year 2003 roundup

2003 films
2000s Kannada-language films
Films scored by Hamsalekha
Indian drama films